Demene Hall (November 4, 1949June 27, 2018) was an American actress. She is known for her performance in the 1977 horror film Death Bed: The Bed That Eats. In addition to her screen work, Hall was a prolific stage actress in the Seattle area for over several decades.

Filmography

Film

Television

References

External links

1949 births
2018 deaths
Actresses from Michigan
Actresses from Seattle
African-American actresses
American film actresses
American stage actresses